Aboubakry Dia (born 17 April 1967) is a retired Senegalese sprinter who specialized in the 400 metres.

He is best known for finishing fourth in the 4 × 400 metres relay at the 1996 Olympic Games, together with Moustapha Diarra, Hachim Ndiaye and Ibou Faye. The team ran in a Senegalese record.

His personal best time was 46.50 seconds (1991).

References

1967 births
Living people
Senegalese male sprinters
Athletes (track and field) at the 1996 Summer Olympics
Olympic athletes of Senegal